Ulla (Johanna Ulrica) Stenberg, née Colliander (1792–1858) was a Swedish damask maker.

Stenberg was the daughter of vicar Nils Johan Colliander in Jönköping. She was professional damask maker from 1822, and had her own weaving school from 1830. She also designed her own damask patterns. She participated in the art exhibitions at the Prince Carl Palace in Stockholm 1834-40 and in Stockholm and London in 1851 and Paris in 1855. She had a Royal Warrant of Appointment in Sweden and international customers.

References 
Citations

Bibliography
  Svenskt konstnärslexikon (Swedish Art dictionary) Allhems Förlag, Malmö (1952)

Further reading 
 

Swedish women artists
1792 births
1858 deaths
Swedish textile artists
People from Jönköping
19th-century Swedish businesspeople
19th-century Swedish artists
19th-century women textile artists
19th-century textile artists
19th-century Swedish businesswomen